Hectaphelia is a genus of moths of the family Tortricidae.

Species
Hectaphelia hectaea (Meyrick, 1911)
Hectaphelia kapakoana Razowski, 2006
Hectaphelia mensaria (Meyrick, 1912)
Hectaphelia metapyrrha (Meyrick, 1918)
Hectaphelia periculosa Razowski, 2006
Hectaphelia pharetrata (Meyrick, 1909)
Hectaphelia sporadias (Meyrick, 1920)
Hectaphelia tortuosa (Meyrick, 1912)
Hectaphelia vestigialis (Meyrick, 1914)

Etymology
The generic name refers to the name of the closely related genus Aphelia and the name of one of the species (Hectaphelia hectaea).

See also
List of Tortricidae genera

References

 , 2013: An illustrated catalogue of the specimens of Tortricidae in the Iziko South African Museum, Cape Town (Lepidoptera: Tortricidae). Shilap Revista de Lepidopterologia 41 (162): 213–240.

External links
tortricidae.com

Archipini
Tortricidae genera